The 2022 Axion Open was a professional tennis tournament played on outdoor clay courts. It was the tenth edition of the tournament which was part of the 2022 ITF Women's World Tennis Tour. It took place in Chiasso, Switzerland between 18 and 24 April 2022.

Singles main draw entrants

Seeds

 1 Rankings are as of 11 April 2022.

Other entrants
The following players received wildcards into the singles main draw:
  Alina Granwehr
  Leonie Küng
  Céline Naef
  Sebastianna Scilipoti

The following players received entry as special exempts:
  Martina Di Giuseppe
  Raluca Șerban

The following players received entry from the qualifying draw:
  Erika Andreeva
  Irene Burillo Escorihuela
  Jenny Dürst
  Elsa Jacquemot
  Dalila Jakupović
  Miriam Kolodziejová
  Anna Sisková
  Natalia Vikhlyantseva

Champions

Singles

  Lucia Bronzetti def.  Simona Waltert, 2–6, 6–3, 6–3.

Doubles

  Anastasia Dețiuc /  Miriam Kolodziejová def.  Aliona Bolsova /  Oksana Selekhmeteva, 6–3, 1–6, [10–8]

References

External links
 2022 Axion Open at ITFtennis.com
 Official website

2022 ITF Women's World Tennis Tour
2022 in Swiss sport
April 2022 sports events in Switzerland